Elkmont may refer to:

Elkmont, Alabama
Elkmont, Tennessee